The Battle of Craney Island was a victory for the United States during the War of 1812. The battle saved the city of Norfolk, and the adjacent city of Portsmouth, from British invasion. Especially important to Virginia and northeastern North Carolina, the region was a major hub for American commerce.

Background
Admiral Sir George Cockburn commanded a British fleet blockading Chesapeake Bay. In early 1813, Cockburn and Admiral Sir John B. Warren planned to attack the Gosport Shipyard in Portsmouth and capture the frigate U.S.S. Constellation. Brigadier General Robert B. Taylor commanded the Virginia Militia in the Norfolk area. Taylor hastily built defenses around Norfolk and Portsmouth, but he had no intentions of letting the British penetrate as far as those two cities. Instead Taylor commandeered several ships and created a chain barrier across the Elizabeth River between Fort Norfolk and Fort Nelson. He next built the Craney Island Fort on the island of the same name at the mouth of the Elizabeth River near Hampton Roads. Since the Constellation was already penned up in the Chesapeake because of the British blockade, the ship's crew was used to man some of the redoubts on the island. In all, 596 Americans were defending the fortifications on Craney Island.

Battle
On the morning of June 22, 1813, a British landing party of 700 Royal Marines and soldiers of the 102nd Regiment of Foot along with a company of Independent Foreigners came ashore at Hoffler's Creek near the mouth of the Nansemond River to the west of Craney Island. When the British landed, the defenders realized they were not flying a flag and quickly raised an American flag over the breastworks. The defenders fired, and the attackers began to fall back, realizing that they could not ford the water between the mainland and the island (the Thoroughfare) under such fire. British barges manned by sailors, Royal Marines, and the other company of Independent Foreigners then attempted to attack the eastern side of the island. Defending this portion was a company of light artillery under the command of Captain Arthur Emmerson. Emmerson ordered his gunners to hold their fire until the British were in range. Once they opened fire, the British attackers were driven off, with some barges destroyed, and they retreated back to the ships.  The Americans captured the 24-oar barge Centipede, flagship of the British landing force, and mortally wounded the commmander of the amphibious assault force, Sir John Hanchett, illegitimate son of King George III.

Aftermath
The Americans had scored a defensive victory in the face of a much larger force. Norfolk and the Gosport Navy Yard were spared from attack. Having failed in their attempt to attack Norfolk, Warren and Cockburn moved north for actions in the Chesapeake Bay, including an attempt to attack St. Michaels, Maryland, in August.

Two days after the engagement at Craney Island, British forces crossed the Hampton Roads via Craney Island and raided the town of Hampton, Virginia. The raid was mostly carried out by the Independent Companies of Foreigners, a British military regiment consisting solely of former French prisoners of war who had enlisted into the unit in exchange for being released from captivity in prison hulks; as a result of the raid, Hampton was burned to the ground. A British officer described the actions of the Independent Companies of Foreigners in his diary: "Every horror was perpetrated with impunity – rape, murder, pillage – and not a single man was punished." After the raid, several Americans sent letters to the British criticizing the actions of the Independent Companies of Foreigners during the raid. In response, Quartermaster-General Thomas Sydney Beckwith replied that though outrages had been committed during the raid, they were in response to an incident during the battle where three boats containing troops from the Independent Companies of Foreigners were stranded by American cannon-fire; U.S. forces waded towards the boats to capture them, and Lieutenant-Colonel Charles James Napier later recalled that "One boat with thirty of the foreigners [was] stranded with a shot through her, and the Americans, wading to it, deliberately massacred the poor men!" In response to claims that American forces had committed a massacre during the battle, Taylor, "while not denying the firing upon the boats out of general necessity during the action, conveniently noted that the stranded Frenchmen were not deliberately targeted, and found that only one was shot... while attempting to escape." 22 soldiers from the Independent Companies of Foreigners were captured by the Americans, "lending some credence to the Americans’ claims." Irregardless, "rumours of cold-blooded American brutality enraged the British forces, [with] Napier noting that his own men and the Foreigners took the news particularly badly."

The repulse at Craney Island did not deter the British from further operations in Hampton Roads the next year. That year in 1814, they proceeded up the Chesapeake Bay to burn Washington, D.C., as there were no forts guarding the mouth of the bay at the time (this led to the building of Fort Monroe beginning in the 1820s, to close the bay to enemy vessels). American troops defeated a British landing attempt at Caulk's Field one week later and an assault on Baltimore roughly two weeks after that, ending British incursions in the mid-Atlantic.

Legacy
Three active battalions of the US Regular Army's 4th Infantry Regiment (1–4 Inf, 2–4 Inf and 3–4 Inf) perpetuate the lineages of the old 20th Infantry Regiment, which had elements that participated in the Battle of Craney Island.

Virginia Historical Marker K-258 (The Battle of Craney Island) (at the entrance to Hoffler Creek Wildlife Preserve on Twin Pines Road) commemorates the battle.

References and further reading

 Forester, C. S., The Age of Fighting Sail, New English Library
 Chartrand, R., British Forces in North America, 1793–1815, London: Osprey Publishing, 1998, 
 George, Christopher T., Terror on the Chesapeake: The War of 1812 on the Bay, Shippensburg, Pa., White Mane, 2001, 
 Latimer, Jon, 1812: War with America, Cambridge, Massachusetts: Harvard University Press, 2007, 
 Pitch, Anthony S.The Burning of Washington, Annapolis: Naval Institute Press, 2000. 
 Roosevelt, Theodore, The Naval War of 1812, Random House, New York, 
 Whitehorne, Joseph A., The Battle for Baltimore 1814, Baltimore: Nautical & Aviation Publishing, 1997, 

Larry, Aaron G., Pittsylvania County and the War of 1812, Charleston, South Carolina, The History Press, 
Hallahan, John M., The Battle of Craney Island: A Matter of Credit, Saint Michael's Press, 1986, 

Conflicts in 1813
Battles involving the United Kingdom
1813 in Virginia
Battles of the War of 1812 in Virginia
Battles of the Chesapeake campaign
June 1813 events